November Cotton Flower (2010) is the posthumous collection by American short story writer and essayist Jaykub Allen Hurley. A Foreword is written by Czech-Mexican writer Pavel Miklo Velka. The collection also includes letters and artwork originally by Hurley. The stories and essays in the order they appear in the book:
 "Striver's Row", a short story originally published in Southern Review (2007)
 "Loop-Jammed L" short story originally published in Southern Review (2008)
 "Lewis Halfway" short story published posthumously in AGNI (2009)
 "Rock a-by-by" short story published posthumously in Colorado Review (2009)
 "To Be Young Gifted and Black" essay published posthumously in Iowa Review (2010)
 "Red Nigger Moon" essay originally published in Mid-American Review (2007)
 "Reapers" essay published posthumously in Iowa Review (2010)
 "Song of Son" essay previously unpublished
 "Deep East" essay previously unpublished
 "Walking" essay previously unpublished

References

American essays
American short story collections
2010 short story collections